Keewatin Region may refer to:

 Keewatin Region, Nunavut, a census division of Nunavut, and as the Kivalliq Region an administrative region 
 Keewatin Region, Northwest Territories, a  region of the Northwest Territories until 1999, with similar but non-coterminal boundaries to the above.